Laurent Hernu (born 22 August 1976 in Creil, Oise) is a French decathlete. In 2015, Hernu coached about 20 other athletes, including French sprint athlete Marie Gayot.

Achievements

References

External links

1976 births
Living people
French decathletes
Athletes (track and field) at the 2000 Summer Olympics
Athletes (track and field) at the 2004 Summer Olympics
Olympic athletes of France
People from Creil
Sportspeople from Oise
21st-century French people